Zavrh pod Šmarno Goro is a settlement in the Municipality of Medvode in the Upper Carniola region of Slovenia.

Name
Zavrh pod Šmarno Goro was attested in written sources as Newdorf in 1372, Kollenperg in 1420, Padwercham in 1436, and Nasa orchim in 1456. The name of the settlement was changed from Zavrh to Zavrh pod Šmarno goro in 1955.

Notable people
Notable people that were born or lived in Zavrh pod Šmarno Goro include:
Jakob Aljaž (1845–1927), Roman Catholic priest, composer, and mountaineer

References

External links

Zavrh pod Šmarno Goro on Geopedia

Populated places in the Municipality of Medvode